The Governor of Kharkiv Oblast is the head of executive branch for the Kharkiv Oblast.

The office of Governor is an appointed position, with officeholders being appointed by the President of Ukraine, on recommendation from the Prime Minister of Ukraine, to serve a four-year term. On 24 December 2021 Oleh Synyehubov was appointed Governor of Kharkiv Oblast.

The official residence for the Governor is located in Kharkiv.

Governors

Chairman of Executive Committee of Kharkiv Oblast
 Vasyl Kuzmenko (1932–1933)
 Illya Shelekhes (1933–1934)
 Ivan Fedyayev (1934–1935)
 Grygoriy Pryadchenko (1935–1937)
 ? (1937–1938)
 Grygoriy Butenko (1938–1940)
 Petro Svynarenko (1940–1942)
 Nazi German occupation (1941–1943) 
 Fyodor Artem (1942–1943?) (acting)
 Dmytro Zhila (1943) (acting)
 Ivan Voloshyn (1943–1954)
 Dmytro Pisnyachevsky (1954–1963)
 Kostyantyn Trusov (1963–1964)
 Dmytro Pisnyachevsky (1964–1968)
 Andriy Bezditko (1968–1983)
 Oleksandr Maselsky (1983–1992)

Representative of the President
 Oleksandr Maselsky (1992–1994)

Chairman of the Executive Committee
 Oleksandr Maselsky (1994–1995)

Heads of the Administration
 Oleksandr Maselsky (1995–1996)
 Oleh Dyomin (1996–2000)
 Yevhen Kushnaryov (2000–2004)
 Stepan Maselsky (2004–2005)
 Arsen Avakov (2005–2010)
 Volodymyr Babayev (2010) (acting)
 Mykhailo Dobkin (2010–2014) 
 Ihor Baluta (2014–2015)
 Ihor Raynin (2015–2016)
 Yuliya Svitlychna (15 October 2016-6 November 2019)
 Oleksiy Kucher (6 November 2019-27 November 2020)
 Aina Tymchuk (27 November 2020-11 August 2021)
 Oleksandr Skakun (11 August 2021–24 December 2021, acting)
 Oleh Synyehubov (24 December 2021-incumbent)

Notes

References

Sources
 World Statesmen.org

External links
Government of Kharkiv Oblast in Ukrainian

 
Kharkiv Oblast